Tyquan Lewis (born January 30, 1995) is an American football defensive end for the Indianapolis Colts of the National Football League (NFL). He played college football at Ohio State, and high school football at Tarboro High School.

High school career 
Lewis played high school football for Tarboro High School in Tarboro, North Carolina, where he was part of multiple state championship teams. As a senior, he was named to the Associated Press' North Carolina all-football team. Coming out of high school, Lewis was rate a four-star prospect by major recruiting services. A member of the class of 2013, Lewis committed to Ohio State University on September 20, 2012. Lewis also had scholarship offers from schools such as Louisiana State University, the University of North Carolina, Virginia Tech, and Clemson University. He had to convince his mother of the merits of going to Ohio State; she was worried because of the far distance from North Carolina.

Collegiate career 
His redshirt freshman year at Ohio State, Lewis appeared in every game whether on defense or playing a small role on special teams. He recorded nine tackles on the season.

For his sophomore season, Lewis broke into the regular rotation and led the team in quarterback sacks with eight and finished second to teammate Joey Bosa in tackles for loss with fourteen. Lewis received a national championship ring as the Buckeyes won their eighth National Championship in the first College Football Playoff in January 2015.  For his efforts, Lewis was named Honorable Mention on the 2015 All-Big Ten Conference football team. He played through the season with an injured labrum, which he had injured the previous spring, and had a surgical procedure to repair the muscle the following January.

Lewis continued his award-winning ways in 2016, as he racked up 7.5 sacks, sealed a win against Wisconsin, was named a captain, and won multiple accolades while developing into a leader off the field.  He was named first-team 2016 All-Big Ten Conference football team and was the Big Ten Conference Defensive Lineman of the Year. In January 2017, Lewis announced that he would skip the 2017 NFL Draft and return to OSU for his senior season.

Along with teammate J. T. Barrett, Lewis was named a Big Ten Preseason Honoree before his senior season. He later earned a spot on the first team of the 2017 All-Big Ten Conference football team. He also recorded 6.5 tackles for loss and five quarterback sacks. Lewis also tied the Ohio State football record for games played with 55. In the Senior Bowl, Lewis had one and a half sacks, including working with Ogbonnia Okoronkwo for a strip-sack.

Professional career 
On December 18, 2017, it was announced that Lewis had accepted his invitation to play in the 2018 Senior Bowl. On January 27, 2018, Lewis recorded four combined tackles and a sack as part of Denver Broncos' head coach Vance Joseph's North team that lost 45–16 to the South.
Lewis attended the NFL Scouting Combine in Indianapolis, but was limited to the vertical jump and broad jump due to a bout with the flu. On March 22, 2018, Lewis participated at Ohio State's pro day and performed the majority of combine drills, but chose to skip the vertical jump. At the conclusion of the pre-draft process, Lewis was projected to be a third or fourth round pick by the majority of NFL draft experts and scouts. He was ranked the ninth best defensive end prospect in the draft by Scouts Inc. and was ranked the 12th best defensive end by DraftScout.com.

The Indianapolis Colts selected Lewis in the second round (64th overall) of the 2018 NFL Draft. The Indianapolis Colts traded their third (67th overall) and sixth round (178th overall) picks to the Cleveland Browns and drafted Lewis with the second round pick they received in exchange.

On May 11, 2018, the Indianapolis Colts signed Lewis to a four-year, $4.36 million contract that includes a signing bonus of $1.25 million. He was placed on injured reserve on September 3, 2018, with a toe injury. He was activated off injured reserve on November 9, 2018.

In Week 8 of the 2020 season against the Detroit Lions, Lewis recorded two sacks on Matthew Stafford during the 41–21 win.

On November 1, 2021, Lewis was placed on injured reserve after suffering a season-ending knee injury in Week 8.

On March 16, 2022, Lewis signed a one-year, $3 million contract extension with the Colts. He suffered a ruptured patellar tendon in Week 8 and was placed on injured reserve on October 31, 2022.

On March 13, 2023, Lewis re-signed with the Indianapolis Colts.

Personal life 
Lewis has four brothers and a sister.

References

External links
 Ohio State Profile

1995 births
Living people
People from Tarboro, North Carolina
Players of American football from North Carolina
American football defensive linemen
Ohio State Buckeyes football players
Indianapolis Colts players